The Hodoșa (Hungarian pronunciation: , meaning Beavery) is a right tributary of the river Niraj in Romania. It discharges into the Niraj in Mitrești.

References

Rivers of Romania
Rivers of Mureș County